No Need for Alarm is the second solo studio album by American hip hop musician Del the Funky Homosapien. It was released in 1993 through Elektra Records. Recording sessions took place at Hyde Street Studios in San Francisco and at Chung King House of Metal in New York City. The album spawned the two singles "Catch A Bad One", and "Wrong Place" Production was handled by Del himself along with A-Plus, Casual, Domino, Jay-Biz, Snupe and Stimulated Dummies.

The album peaked at number 125 on the Billboard 200 chart.

Critical reception
Nathan Rabin of AllMusic called the album "a challenging, unique, and uncompromising follow-up, one well worth picking up for anyone interested in either the evolution of West Coast hip-hop or just the evolution of one of its most talented, eccentric, and gifted artists".

Track listing

Personnel
 Teren Delvon Jones – vocals, producer (tracks: 3, 9, 10, 13)
 Unicron – vocals (track 7)
 Adam "A-Plus" Carter – vocals (track 8), turntables (tracks: 5, 7, 11, 14), producer (track 14)
 Jon "Casual" Owens – vocals (track 8), producer (tracks: 2, 7)
 Duane 'Snupe' Lee – vocals (track 8), producer (track 1)
 Toure Batiste Duncan – turntables (track 1)
 Jamie "Jay-Biz" Suarez – turntables (tracks: 12, 13), production (track 12)
 Damian "Domino" Siguenza – producer (tracks: 4, 8, 11)
 Stimulated Dummies – producers (tracks: 5, 6)
 Matt Kelley – engineering (tracks: 1-4, 7-14)
 John Gamble – engineering (tracks: 5, 6)
 Tim Latham – mixing
 Ross Yeo – assistant engineering
 Adam Cudzin – assistant mixing
 Joe Thomas – assistant mixing
 Brian "Big Bass" Gardner – mastering
 Scott Idleman – design
 Carl Posey – photography

Charts

References

External links

1993 albums
Del the Funky Homosapien albums
Elektra Records albums
Albums produced by Dante Ross
Albums produced by John Gamble (record producer)
Albums recorded at Chung King Studios